XHGLX-FM ("Exa FM") is a commercial radio station broadcasting from Tijuana at 91.7 MHz. The station airs a Top 40 radio format.

The programs and most of the music are presented in Spanish, while a number of English-language songs are also heard. The station is currently owned by MVS Radio.

History
XHTIM-FM came to air in 1990 carrying MVS's Stereorey format, and its early years were filled with major changes. It started broadcasting on 103.3 MHz, the frequency that had been made available on March 16, 1989 in the Diario Oficial de la Federación. However, XHTIM soon picked up interference complaints from KJQY in San Diego, broadcasting just up the FM dial at 103.7. In an attempt to solve its interference to KJQY, XHTIM found a new home at 91.5 MHz, beginning January 27, 1992. This triggered a complaint from another American station, KUSC in Los Angeles, a public radio and classical music outlet. At the time, KUSC had been attempting to move its transmitter to Mount Wilson, a high point near Los Angeles that is home to numerous FM and TV stations. The XHTIM allotment was short-spaced to KUSC by 23 kilometers, and XHTIM was causing interference to the classical music outlet well into the Los Angeles area. KUSC claimed XHTIM was operating illegally and called on the Federal Communications Commission to seek help from its Mexican counterpart, the Secretaría de Comunicaciones y Transportes (SCT).

The dispute between KUSC and XHTIM came to an amicable end. In 1993, KUSC was able to turn on its new transmitter. On March 20, XHTIM moved to 91.7 MHz, a change that allowed XHTIM to ramp up power and cleared the interference plaguing KUSC. Later in 1993, XHTIM flipped to grupera music as "La Mejor."

In 1999 XHTIM adopted the name "Galaxy" and a classic hits format, as well as the call sign XHGLX-FM. The Galaxy format was short-lived, with MVS changing the station in 2001 to a new format, known as Exa FM. The first broadcast with the new format aired on May 5, with special guest Yahir, a popular Mexican singer-actor. The station was launched by Programming Director Isabel Gonzalez, who exited the company in May 2007.

In May 2006, the station's studio facilities moved to National City, California, just south of San Diego.  From 2010–11, the station was known as "Diego." In October 2011, the station returned to Exa FM and its Top 40 format as MVS moved Diego to 99.3 XHOCL.

External links

References

Contemporary hit radio stations in Mexico
Radio stations in Tijuana
Radio stations established in 1990
MVS Radio